The 2011 WNBA All-Star Game was played on July 23, 2011 (3:30pm EDT on ABC) at the AT&T Center in San Antonio, Texas, home of the San Antonio Silver Stars. The game was the 10th WNBA All-Star Game, which has been held annually since 1999 except in 2004, 2008, and 2010. This was the first time San Antonio hosted the basketball showcase, and only the second time in league history for the game to be held by a Western Conference franchise.

In a game that saw neither team lead by more than 5 points, the Eastern Conference won 118–113 for only their third victory in 10 tries. Swin Cash of the Seattle Storm, who had 21 points and 12 rebounds in a losing effort, was named game MVP for the second time; only Lisa Leslie had previously earned multiple All-Star Game MVP awards.

The game also saw a record of 10 players (11 counting the injured Candace Parker) make their debuts on a WNBA All-Star team—however, five of these players had appeared in the Stars at the Sun game in 2010, which is not considered an All-Star Game.

The All-Star Game

Rosters

Results

The Top 15

At halftime, the WNBA announced its list of the top 15 players in the 15 seasons of the league. The honorees were elected in balloting by fans, national media, and current players and coaches. Named to the team were:
Sue Bird
Tamika Catchings
Cynthia Cooper-Dyke
Yolanda Griffith
Becky Hammon
Lauren Jackson
Lisa Leslie
Ticha Penicheiro
Cappie Pondexter
Katie Smith
Dawn Staley
Sheryl Swoopes
Diana Taurasi
Tina Thompson
Teresa Weatherspoon

References

Wnba All-star Game, 2011
Women's National Basketball Association All-Star Game
Basketball competitions in San Antonio
Women's sports in Texas